Mike Bradley (born February 27, 1961) is an American former sprinter. He set a collegiate record in the 600 meters in December 1983 in Saskatoon, Saskatchewan. His personal Record of 45.34 seconds for the 400 meters was set at the 1983 TAC Meet in Indianapolis, Indiana. He was a two-time Big 8 Champion at 600 yards.  His Big 8 record of 1:08.89 was set in February 1983. he was the Kansas State High School Champion in the 100, 200 and 400 meters in 1979.; all in state record times. He was a Class 1A State Player of the Year in basketball, averaging over 25 points per game. He was a member of the 4×400 meter relay team that won a gold medal at the 1983 Pan Am Games, setting a Pan Am Games record for the event of 3:00.47.

References

1961 births
Living people
American male sprinters
Track and field athletes from Kansas
Pan American Games gold medalists for the United States
Athletes (track and field) at the 1983 Pan American Games
Pan American Games medalists in athletics (track and field)
Medalists at the 1983 Pan American Games